Little Sioux is a city in Harrison County, Iowa, United States. The population was 166 at the time of the 2020 census.  The city is most known for Little Sioux Scout Ranch of the Boy Scouts of America.

History
Little Sioux was laid out in 1855.

Geography
Little Sioux is located at  (41.809169, -96.022556).

Demographics

2010 census
As of the census of 2010, there were 170 people, 78 households, and 51 families living in the city. The racial makeup of the city was 100.0% White. Hispanic or Latino of any race were 2.4% of the population.

There were 78 households, of which 23.1% had children under the age of 18 living with them, 46.2% were married couples living together, 12.8% had a female householder with no husband present, 6.4% had a male householder with no wife present, and 34.6% were non-families. 33.3% of all households were made up of individuals, and 14.1% had someone living alone who was 65 years of age or older. The average household size was 2.18 and the average family size was 2.67.

The median age in the city was 48.5 years. 17.1% of residents were under the age of 18; 5.8% were between the ages of 18 and 24; 18.9% were from 25 to 44; 38.9% were from 45 to 64; and 19.4% were 65 years of age or older. The gender makeup of the city was 52.4% male and 47.6% female.

2000 census
As of the census of 2000, there were 217 people, 96 households, and 62 families living in the city. The racial makeup of the city was 99.54% White, 0.46% from other races. Hispanic or Latino of any race were 0.46% of the population.

There were 96 households, out of which 22.9% had children under the age of 18 living with them, 51.0% were married couples living together, 10.4% had a female householder with no husband present, and 34.4% were non-families. 29.2% of all households were made up of individuals, and 16.7% had someone living alone who was 65 years of age or older. The average household size was 2.26 and the average family size was 2.78.

In the city, the population was spread out, with 20.7% under the age of 18, 9.2% from 18 to 24, 24.9% from 25 to 44, 26.3% from 45 to 64, and 18.9% who were 65 years of age or older. The median age was 42 years. For every 100 females, there were 92.0 males. For every 100 females age 18 and over, there were 89.0 males.

The median income for a household in the city was $28,583, and the median income for a family was $29,750. Males had a median income of $27,321 versus $16,250 for females. The per capita income for the city was $20,410. About 13.4% of families and 17.8% of the population were below the poverty line, including 28.0% of those under the age of eighteen and 21.2% of those 65 or over.

Education
It is within the West Harrison Community School District.

References

Cities in Iowa
Cities in Harrison County, Iowa